Fabrizio Maturani, known as Martufello (Sezze, December 21, 1951), is an Italian comedian, cabaret artist, humorist and actor.

Biography 
He began his career as a comedian and cabaret artist in village festivals and in the local province of Latina. During one of his shows in Latina, he is noticed by a manager who, in turn, signals him to Pier Francesco Pingitore. This, towards the end of the seventies, calls him as a helper joke in his theater company "Il Bagaglino".

Martufello subsequently links his career to Bagaglino, becoming over time one of the most representative members of the theatrical, television and film shows staged by the group, until 2011 (year of dissolution of the company). Along the eighties, also acts in small parts in some films of Steno (The Tango of Jealousy, Bonnie and Clyde Italian and an ideal adventure), in the censored W la foca by Nando Cicero and in the second and last film directed by Renzo Arbore "FF.SS." - Cioè: "...che mi hai portato a fare sopra a Posillipo se non mi vuoi più bene?

In 1995 he wrote a book of jokes entitled Di più, nin zo', in which he reproposes his sketches based on the figure of the "" (as he defines himself); in the same year he is the protagonist of the film Chiavi in mano by Mariano Laurenti, unfortunate remake of Quel gran pezzo dell'Ubalda tutta nuda e tutta calda, in the role of Baccello da Sarnano. Since September 2014 he is part of the cast of Avanti un altro! on Canale 5, in the role of joke teller. On July 25, 2015 he is the victim of a car accident in Vetralla, reporting the fracture of the nasal septum and various other contusions to the head and legs.

He is a partner in Grandi Magazzini Italiani srl.

Career

Television 

 Biberon (1987-1990) - Rai 1
 Cocco (1988-1989) - Rai 2
 Stasera mi butto (1990) - Rai 2
 Crème Caramel (1991) - Rai 1
 Saluti e baci (1993) - Rai 1
 Bucce di banana (1994) - Rai 1
 Beato tra le donne (1994-1997) - dapprima su Rai 1 e in seguito su Canale 5
 Champagne! (1995) - Canale 5
 Rose Rosse (1996) - Canale 5
 Viva l'Italia! e Viva le italiane! (1997) - Canale 5
 Gran Caffè (1998) - Canale 5
 La Canzone del Secolo (1999) - Canale 5
 BuFFFoni (2000) - Canale 5
 Saloon (2001) - Canale 5
 Marameo (2002) - Canale 5
 Miconsenta (2003) - Canale 5
 Barbecue (2004) - Canale 5
 Tele fai da te (2005) - Canale 5
 Torte in faccia (2006) - Canale 5
 E io... pago! (2007) - Canale 5
 Zona Martufello (2007) - Teleuniverso
 Gabbia di matti (2008) - Canale 5
 Bellissima-Cabaret Anticrisi (2009) - Canale 5
 Avanti un altro! (2014) - Canale 5
 Magnamose tutto! (2017) - Canale 5
 Soliti ignoti (2020) - Rai 1

Theater 

 50 sfumature di Renzi, scripted and directed by Pier Francesco Pingitore (2015)
 L'imbianchino, scripted by Donald Churchill (2019)
 La Presidente - Valeria Marini eletta al Quirinale, scripted and directed by Pier Francesco Pingitore (2019-2020)

Filmography

Cinema 

 Ciao marziano, directed by Pier Francesco Pingitore (1980)
 Il casinista, directed by Pier Francesco Pingitore (1980)
 Il tango della gelosia, directed by Steno (1981)
 Biancaneve &amp; Co., directed by Mario Bianchi (1982)
 W la foca, directed by Nando Cicero (1982)
 Attenti a quei P2, directed by Pier Francesco Pingitore (1982)
 Sballato, gasato, completamente fuso, directed by Steno (1982)
 Bonnie e Clyde all'italiana, directed by Steno (1983)
 Il tifoso, l'arbitro e il calciatore, directed by Francesco Pingitore (1983)
 "FF.SS." - Cioè: "...che mi hai portato a fare sopra a Posillipo se non mi vuoi più bene?", directed by Renzo Arbore (1983)
 Sfrattato cerca casa equo canone, directed by Pier Francesco Pingitore (1983)
 Gole ruggenti, directed by Francesco Pingitore (1992)
 Chiavi in mano, directed by Mariano Laurenti (1996)
 La partita, cortometraggio (2007)
 Qui a Manduria tutto bene, directed by Enzo Pisconti (2008)
 Nemici, directed by Milo Vallone (2020)

Television 

 Ladri si nasce, directed by Pier Francesco Pingitore – film TV (1997)
 Ladri si diventa, directed by Pier Francesco Pingitore – film TV (1998)
 Villa Ada, directed by Pier Francesco Pingitore – film TV (2000)
 La casa delle beffe, directed by Pier Francesco Pingitore – film TV (2000)
 Di che peccato sei?, directed by Pier Francesco Pingitore – film TV (2007)
 Il Divin Codino, directed by Letizia Lamartire - film Netflix (2021)

Books

References

Sister projects 

Italian impressionists (entertainers)
Italian male television actors
Italian male stage actors
21st-century Italian male actors
20th-century Italian male actors
Italian film actors
Living people
1951 births
21st-century Italian comedians
20th-century Italian comedians
Italian humorists
Italian cabaret performers
Italian male comedians